Derek Christopher Lowe (born June 1, 1973) is an American former professional baseball pitcher. During his career, he played in Major League Baseball (MLB) for the Seattle Mariners, Boston Red Sox, Los Angeles Dodgers, Atlanta Braves, Cleveland Indians, New York Yankees, and Texas Rangers.

Lowe made his MLB debut in 1997. He threw a no-hitter for the Red Sox in 2002. In the 2004 post-season he had a 3–0 win–loss record as he helped lead Boston to its first World Series championship in 86 years.

Early years
Lowe attended Edsel Ford High School in Dearborn, Michigan, where he was a four-sport letterman in baseball, golf, soccer, and basketball. He was an All-League honoree in all four sports, and was a first-team all-state pick in basketball. Lowe committed to attend Eastern Michigan University on a basketball scholarship.

Baseball career

Minor leagues
The Seattle Mariners drafted Lowe in the eighth round of the 1991 MLB draft. He signed with the Mariners on June 7, 1991, forgoing his college scholarship. The Mariners immediately assigned him to their rookie league team, where he went 5–3 with a 2.41 earned run average (ERA) in 12 starts.

He spent the next several years working his way through several minor league teams: 1992 – Single-A Bellingham (7–3, 2.42 – 13 starts), 1993 – Single-A Riverside (12–9, 5.26, 26 starts), 1994 – Double-A Jacksonville (7–10, 4.94, 26 starts), 1995 – Double-A Port City (1–6, 6.08, 10 starts), 1996 – Triple-A Tacoma (6–9, 4.54, 16 starts).

Seattle Mariners
Lowe made his major league debut on April 26, 1997, working  innings in relief against the Toronto Blue Jays. He made his first major league start on May 27 against the Minnesota Twins, giving up four runs in five innings. His first career win came on June 6 against the Detroit Tigers, pitching  innings and giving up 3 runs in the Mariners' 6–3 victory.

Seattle, however, was desperate for immediate bullpen help, and packaged Lowe and catcher Jason Varitek into a deal with the Boston Red Sox for Heathcliff Slocumb. The trade on July 31 by Mariner's vice president Woody Woodward is considered one of the most lopsided in MLB history.

Boston Red Sox
Lowe compiled a 5–15 record over his first two seasons, during which he split time starting and relieving, but came into his own in 1999 after being transferred into the closer's role, finishing the season with 15 saves and a 2.63 ERA.

Lowe had his best season as a closer in 2000 when he led the American League with 42 saves and recorded a 2.56 ERA. Despite recording 24 saves early in the 2001 season, Lowe lost the closer's job soon after the trading deadline when the Red Sox acquired Ugueth Urbina. Lowe was left in limbo, forced to take various setup jobs in the bullpen. Lowe asked manager Joe Kerrigan to return him to the starting rotation, and he pitched 16 innings as a starter before the end of the season. As a starter in 2002, Lowe posted a 21–8 record, a 2.58 ERA, and finished third in Cy Young Award voting behind Barry Zito and teammate Pedro Martínez. Lowe also no-hit the Tampa Bay Devil Rays at Fenway Park on April 27 that year, becoming the first pitcher to do so at Fenway Park since Dave Morehead in 1965. Lowe faced just one over the minimum in the game; only a third inning walk to Brent Abernathy separated Lowe from a perfect game. Additionally, Lowe was the starting pitcher for the American League in the All-Star Game that year.

Lowe posted a 17–7 record despite a 4.47 ERA in 2003. He recorded an improbable save in deciding Game 5 of the 2003 American League Division Series, helped by two clutch strikeouts.

In 2004, he finished 14–12 with a 5.42 ERA in 33 starts. During the postseason he rebounded with a 3–0 record and 1.86 ERA in four games, three of them starts. He was the winner in the final game of all three postseason series—American League Division Series against the Anaheim Angels, American League Championship Series against the New York Yankees, and World Series against the St. Louis Cardinals (where he threw shutout ball for 7 innings in Game 4, to defeat Jason Marquis) — as the Red Sox won their first World Series in 86 years. However, the win against the Angels was coming in relief. Lowe later said that the team would no longer have to hear "1918", a derisive chant mocking the Red Sox's previously most recent title win, at Yankee Stadium.

Los Angeles Dodgers

On January 11, 2005, Lowe finalized a $36 million, four-year contract with the Los Angeles Dodgers. Despite his signing with a new team, Lowe wore a Red Sox uniform, with his career-long number of 32, during the Red Sox World Series ring ceremony on April 11, 2005, after already making a start for the Dodgers.

On August 31, 2005, Lowe nearly pitched the second no-hitter of his career. After giving up a leadoff single to the Cubs' Jerry Hairston Jr., Lowe did not allow another Chicago hit, picking up a one-hit, two-walk, 7–0 complete game victory while facing only 29 batters.

For the 2008 season, after being the opening day starter for the Dodgers for the last three years, he was moved to the second starting position, behind Brad Penny. Lowe was chosen by manager Joe Torre to start Game 1 of the National League Championship series against the Philadelphia Phillies on October 9, 2008. Lowe opened the game with five scoreless innings.

Both times that the Dodgers acquired Greg Maddux midseason, Lowe performed visibly better afterwards. He indicated that Maddux helped him considerably, and Maddux was often seen sitting next to him in the dugout.

Atlanta Braves
Lowe agreed to a four-year, $60 million deal with the Atlanta Braves during the 2008–09 offseason. Manager Bobby Cox announced that Lowe would start both Opening Day and the Braves home opener for the 2009 season. Lowe beat the Phillies 4–1 on Opening Night, going 8 innings and giving up just 2 hits and 0 runs.

In 2010, Lowe was one of only two active players, along with Liván Hernández, to have played 12 or more seasons without going on the disabled list.

Despite having a mediocre season until August, Lowe was exceptional in September 2010, with a 5–0 record, a 1.77 ERA, 29 strikeouts while walking only three batters, which helped the Braves secure a playoff berth as the NL Wild Card, being one game ahead of the second place Padres at the end of the regular season. For this, Lowe was named National League Pitcher of the Month.

On August 31, 2011, Lowe hit his first home run (in 425 at-bats) off John Lannan of the Washington Nationals.

Cleveland Indians

Following the 2011 season, the Braves traded Lowe to the Cleveland Indians for minor league left-handed relief pitcher Chris Jones. The Braves paid $10 million of Lowe's $15 million salary for the 2012 season. On May 15, 2012 in a road game versus the Minnesota Twins, Lowe recorded his first shutout in seven years and also pitched a complete game in a 5-0 Tribe win, improving his season pitching record to 6-1. Lowe did not record a strikeout in the shutout, becoming the first pitcher to do so since 2002.

The Indians designated Lowe for assignment on August 1 to make room for Corey Kluber. Lowe was 8-10 with a 5.52 ERA in 21 starts and 119 innings pitched. The Indians released Lowe on August 10.

New York Yankees

On August 12, 2012, Lowe signed with the New York Yankees. He made his Yankees debut on August 13 pitching four scoreless innings of relief and got his first regular season save since 2001. Lowe had a 3.04 ERA in 17 appearances, was also on the team's postseason roster. The Yankees defeated the Baltimore Orioles in the 2012 ALDS, but lost to the Detroit Tigers in the 2012 ALCS. Lowe became a free agent after the 2012 season ended.

Texas Rangers
On March 6, 2013, Lowe signed a minor league contract with the Texas Rangers.  He made the team's major league roster, and was with the Rangers on opening day. He was designated for assignment on May 20, 2013.

On June 9, 2013, sports journalist Nick Cafardo reported that Lowe appeared to have retired.  According to Cafardo, Lowe told his agent, Scott Boras, not to approach any teams to see if they have any interest in Lowe.

Lowe officially announced his retirement July 18, 2013.

Lowe was eligible to be elected into the Hall of Fame in 2019, but received less than 5% of the vote and became ineligible for the 2020 ballot.

Scouting report
Lowe was a sinkerball pitcher, throwing the pitch over 60% of the time. He also threw a fastball, curveball and a slider.

Personal life
Lowe has advocated for various causes to fight cancer.  Himself a survivor of squamous cell carcinoma, Lowe has worked with the Melanoma Foundation of New England, the National Council on Skin Cancer Prevention, and The Prostate Cancer Foundation. Lowe was diagnosed with attention deficit disorder and received permission to treat it with Adderall, a substance banned by Major League Baseball.

Lowe was charged with fourth-degree domestic violence by King County police in 1997 after his girlfriend claimed that he struck her. Lowe was released on $1,000 bond the next day, and he allegedly violated a no-contact order by returning to her home shortly after his release. Lowe entered counseling as a result.

Carolyn Hughes, who covered the Dodgers for Fox Sports West, was suspended pending an investigation into a potential relationship between her and Lowe during his tenure with the Dodgers. Shortly thereafter, Lowe filed for divorce from Trinka Lowe, his wife of seven years, with whom he fathered three children. Hughes's husband had also filed for divorce. In the aftermath, Hughes ended her broadcasting career and she and Lowe continued their relationship. They were married on December 13, 2008 at The Henry Ford in Dearborn, Michigan.

On April 28, 2011, Lowe was arrested and charged with driving under the influence, reckless driving, and improper lane change after he was spotted drag racing down an Atlanta street with another car. The trooper who stopped him detected an odor of alcohol and administered a field sobriety test, which resulted in Lowe's arrest. Lowe declined to take a breath test before he was released after posting bail. The other driver was not charged with any offense and was released. On May 26, 2011, both the DUI charge and the reckless driving charge were dismissed by City of Atlanta Solicitor-General Raines Carter, and Lowe entered a nolo contendere (no contest) plea to violating basic motor vehicle rules.

Lowe finished second to Mark Mulder in the July 2017 American Century Championships celebrity golf tournament.

Lowe won the January 2022 LPGA Tournament of Champions Celebrity Division tournament, defeating Annika Sörenstam in a playoff after both scored 138 points.

See also

List of Major League Baseball annual saves leaders
List of Major League Baseball annual wins leaders
List of Major League Baseball no-hitters

References

External links

1973 births
Living people
Seattle Mariners players
Boston Red Sox players
Los Angeles Dodgers players
Atlanta Braves players
Cleveland Indians players
New York Yankees players
Texas Rangers players
American League All-Stars
American League saves champions
Baseball players from Michigan
Major League Baseball pitchers
National League wins champions
Sportspeople from Dearborn, Michigan
Arizona League Mariners players
Bellingham Mariners players
Riverside Pilots players
Jacksonville Suns players
Port City Roosters players
Tacoma Rainiers players
Pawtucket Red Sox players
Edsel Ford High School alumni